Chalani may refer to:

 Chalani, Dahanu, a village in India
 Chalaneh-ye Olya, a village in Iran